Meyers Reisebücher (1862-1936) were a series of German-language travel guide books published by the Bibliographisches Institut of Hildburghausen and Leipzig.

List of Meyers Reisebücher by geographic coverage

Austria
 Österreich-Ungarn, Bosnien und Herzegowina
  +  index

British Isles

Egypt

France
 Paris und Nord-Frankreich

Germany
 Bayerischer und Böhmerwald
 Berlin
 Dresden, Sächsische Schweiz
 Erzgebirge
 Franken und Nürnberg
 Harz 
 Der Hochtourist in den Ostalpen
 Nord-Deutschland
 Oberbayern und München
 Riesengebirge
 Rheinlande
 Rhein
 Schwarzwald
 Süd-Deutschland
 Thüringen
 Deutsche Alpen

Greece
  + index

Italy
 
  + Index
 1892 ed. + Index

Scandinavia

Switzerland

Syria
 
  + index

Turkey
 Balkanstaaten und Konstantinopel
  + index
  + index

List of Meyers Reisebücher by date of publication

1860s-1870s

1880s-1890s

1900s-1910s
  + index

External links

 OCLC. WorldCat

German books
Travel guide books
Series of books
Publications established in the 1860s
Tourism in Europe